Issa Tambedou (born 28 September 1966) is a Senegalese footballer who played as a defender. He played in 13 matches for the Senegal national football team from 1992 to 1995. He was also named in Senegal's squad for the 1994 African Cup of Nations tournament.

References

1966 births
Living people
Place of birth missing (living people)
Senegalese footballers
Senegal international footballers
1994 African Cup of Nations players
Association football defenders